S.T.A.L.K.E.R. 2: Heart of Chornobyl is an upcoming first-person shooter survival horror video game developed and published by Ukrainian game developer GSC Game World. Set to release for Microsoft Windows and the Xbox Series X/S, it will be the fourth game released in the  S.T.A.L.K.E.R. video game series, the first game in the series released on consoles, as well as the first S.T.A.L.K.E.R. game in 13 years since the release of Call of Pripyat in 2009.

Initially announced following the release of Call of Pripyat, it was planned release in 2012, before it was ultimately cancelled on the year of its intended release. The game resurfaced years later in 2018, with the development restarted and powered by Unreal Engine 5. It was scheduled to release on December 8, 2022, but due to the ongoing war in Ukraine, development for the game was put on hold. However, the development team later stated on their official Discord server that the development process continues and is currently set for a 2023 release.

Development

Early development 
S.T.A.L.K.E.R. 2 was initially announced in 2010, with a release date set in 2012, by Sergiy Grygorovych, CEO of GSC Game World, stating "After the official sales of the series exceeded 4 million copies worldwide, we had no doubts left to start creating a new big game in the S.T.A.L.K.E.R. universe. This will be the next chapter of the mega-popular game players expect from us." The development of the game was ambitious; it was stated that the game would feature an all-new multiplatform engine, made from scratch to fit S.T.A.L.K.E.R. 2.

Numerous layoffs and overall attrition during the development of the game had shrunk GSC's employee count by 75%. Two years in, Grygorovych had announced the immediate cessation of all development due to "personal reasons", likely as a result of financial difficulty. GSC Game World was officially dissolved on December 9, 2011. The official Twitter account posted "We will do our best to continue. However, at this moment, nothing is certain." After several months of uncertainty, an update was posted that the development would continue after the holidays, although it would require funding. However, the cancellation of this build of S.T.A.L.K.E.R. 2 had been formally announced in April 2012 on the company's Facebook page, officially stated to have resulted from dispute between investors, staff, and the original IP rights owner.

West Games scandal 
West Games, a studio founded by former GSC lead developer Eugene Kim, had launched a Kickstarter crowdfunding campaign for a spiritual successor to the S.T.A.L.K.E.R. franchise in June 2014, under the title "Areal". However, this drew widespread criticism and was described as a scam, with its trailer entirely composed of footage from the original S.T.A.L.K.E.R. games as well as purported screenshots from its development being revealed as modified assets from the Unity engine's "asset store", which West Games claimed was "media-fabricated". The project drew $65,000 in Kickstarter funds, $15,000 over its original goal of $50,000, however it was permanently suspended by Kickstarter in July, citing guideline violations. After cancellation though (West Games had at first claimed to have switched to private funding on their website to fund the project), they announced another crowdfunding campaign on the Wfunder platform in December 2014, setting a much larger goal of $600,000 to produce a new game called S.T.A.L.K.E.R. Apocalypse.

Revival 
After years of dormancy, GSC Game World was officially reformed in December 2014 to develop Cossacks 3. Four years later, on said game's Facebook page, development of a new S.T.A.L.K.E.R. 2 was announced, linking to www.stalker2.com, the game's website. It was later revealed that the game would be developed using Unreal Engine 4. This build of S.T.A.L.K.E.R. 2 was announced exceptionally early into development, with it still being in the "design doc phase". Grygorovych later stated on a podcast that the intent of the project's announcement in 2018 was largely to generate hype, in order to strike a publishing deal at E3 2018.

Little information was given regarding the project until E3 2021, where a full gameplay trailer was shown at the Microsoft/Bethesda press conference. The release date was rescheduled to April 28, 2022. In August 2021, the developers revealed that the game was updated to Unreal Engine 5.

2022 Russian invasion of Ukraine 

Near the outbreak of the 2022 Russian invasion of Ukraine, GSC, based in Kyiv, released a video on their YouTube account which called for financial aid for the Ukrainian Armed Forces, stating that the outbreak of the war and the need to protect GSC employees has led to the game's development being paused indefinitely. This was also followed by a Twitter post which linked to an account to donate to the Ukrainian military and stated "through pain, death, war, fear, and human cruelty, Ukraine will persevere. As it always does". On March 14, 2022, the game's subtitle was changed to "Heart of Chornobyl", reflecting the region's native Ukrainian spelling rather than the Russian one. On June 14, 2022, GSC stated in a development diary that the development continues despite some of the team fleeing their homes or joining the Armed Forces of Ukraine.

Due to the war, GSC decided to move development of the game to Prague, Czech Republic.

Release 
The game is planned to be on Xbox Game Pass at launch. In addition, the game was stated by GSC Game World to be planned as a Microsoft-exclusive release, only releasing on Microsoft Windows and the Xbox Series X/S. This exclusivity, however, is only slated to be for three months following its release as evidenced from leaked documents as a part of Epic Games v. Apple.

Notes

References

External links
 

Alternate history video games
Chernobyl disaster in fiction
First-person shooters
Post-apocalyptic video games
Science fiction video games
Single-player video games
Survival horror video games
S.T.A.L.K.E.R.
Unreal Engine games
Upcoming video games scheduled for 2023
Video games developed in Ukraine
Video games developed in the Czech Republic
Video games set in Ukraine
Windows games
Xbox Series X and Series S games